Erik Everhard (born December 2, 1976) is the stage name of Mitchell Hartwell, a Canadian pornographic actor and director, known for gonzo pornography films.

Biography
Everhard is a Canadian national of Ukrainian ancestry. In 1995, he moved to Vancouver, British Columbia to attend university, at which time he made his first forays into adult films. Everhard's adult film career began in Canada performing for websites. At the urging of friends and colleagues, he moved to Los Angeles in 1999 to pursue his career. His first shoot in the United States was for director Jules Jordan.

After securing himself as a performer, Everhard began directing videos for Anabolic and Diabolic Video in 2001. In 2003, he landed a distribution deal with Redlight District. In 2005, Everhard left Redlight, suing the company for breach of contract, conversion, claim and delivery, and accounting. He won the suit. He was then hired by Evil Angel Video. After shooting several films with Evil Angel, Everhard returned to work with Jules Jordan.

Everhard performed in about 2,400 films in his pornographic career.

Awards

References

External links 
 Podcast Interview at Adult DVD Talk
 
 
 

1976 births
Canadian male pornographic film actors
Canadian people of Ukrainian descent
Canadian pornographic film directors
Canadian pornographic film producers
Living people
Film directors from Calgary
Male actors from Calgary